"Shut Out The Moon" is the debut single by English singer-songwriter Spark. It was released on 12 July 2010.

Critical reception
Paul Lester from The Guardian described the song saying it "features handclaps, a dirty bassline and a theatrically enunciated vocal that is very stage-school, very Toyah [Willcox]."

Track listings
    UK iTunes EP
"Shut Out The Moon" — 3:21
"Shut Out The Moon" (Monsieur Adi Remix) — 5:13
"Shut Out The Moon" (Pink Ganter Remix) —  4:56

    7" Vinyl
A. "Shut Out The Moon" — 3:21
B. "Shut Out The Moon" (Monsieur Adi Remix) — 5:13

Release history

References

2010 debut singles
Songs written by Peter-John Vettese
2010 songs